Andrei Ryabykh may refer to:

 Andrei Ryabykh (footballer, born 1978), Russian football player
 Andrei Ryabykh (footballer, born 1982), Russian football player